Bowman Bluff is an unincorporated community in Henderson County, in the U.S. state of North Carolina.

History
A post office called Bowman's Bluff was in operation between 1856 and 1904. The community probably derives its name from Mary Bowman.

References

Unincorporated communities in Henderson County, North Carolina
Unincorporated communities in North Carolina